Flybuys may refer to:

 flybuys (Australia), Australian loyalty program
 Flybuys (New Zealand), New Zealand loyalty program

See also 
 Flyby (disambiguation)